Guacimal River (Spanish: Rio Guacimal) is a river of Costa Rica.

References

Rivers of Costa Rica